Salt Springs Township is a township in Greenwood County, Kansas, USA.  As of the 2000 census, its population was 463.

Geography
According to the USGS, it contains four cemeteries: Browns Chapel, Charleston, Pike (historical) and Township.

The streams of Badger Creek, Casner Creek, Crain Creek, Little Salt Creek, Salt Creek and Shawnee Creek run through this township.

Transportation
Salt Springs Township contains one airport or landing strip, Heir Airport.

References
 USGS Geographic Names Information System (GNIS)

External links
 US-Counties.com
 City-Data.com

Townships in Greenwood County, Kansas
Townships in Kansas